Sérgio Abreu (born Sérgio Luis Coutinho Abreu; October 16, 1975 in Rio de Janeiro) is a Brazilian actor and reality television personality, best known for being the runner-up of the third season of the Brazilian version of The Farm.

Filmography

Television

Film

A Fazenda
On September 28, 2010, Sergio Abreu was officially announced as one of the fifteen celebrities contestants on the third season of A Fazenda, the Brazilian version of reality series The Farm, which aired on Rede Record.

During his time in the farm, he developed a close friendship with TV host Luiza Gottschalk, while got involved in arguments with fellow contestant Dudu Pelizzari. Abreu finished as runner-up to model Daniel Bueno after 85 days on December 21, 2010.

References

External links
Sérgio Abreu Profile on R7.com

1975 births
Living people
Male actors from Rio de Janeiro (city)
Brazilian male actors
The Farm (TV series) contestants
Citizens of Portugal through descent